Goodbye America is a 1997 action drama directed by Thierry Notz. The film examines how the closing of the U.S. naval base at Subic Bay, Philippines affected the Filipinos and the Americans who had served there. The film was an attempt to bring Philippine cinema into the international audience.

Plot
As the U.S. Subic Bay naval base's operations slowly wind down and naval manpower begins to dwindle, Commander Hamilton (Wolfgang Bodison) relies on three U.S. Navy SEALs to help keep the base secure. William Hawk (John Haymes Newton), a longtime American sailor nearing the end of a tour of duty, is involved with a Filipina, Lisa Velasquez (Nanette Medved), a representative of the mayor's office in nearby Olongapo City. Lisa has to deal with the economic crisis that the base's closing will bring to her community, as well as her own personal problems brought on by Hawk's imminent departure and the strained relationship of her mother, Anna (Daria Ramirez), and stepfather, Ed (James Brolin).

Paul Bladon (Alexis Arquette), another Navy SEAL at the Subic Bay base, is the son of a U.S. Senator (Michael York), who will be visiting Subic Bay for the base's closing ceremonies. Senator Bladon is bringing along Paul's American girlfriend Angela (Maureen Flannigan), though Paul has fallen in love with a Filipina, Emma (Alma Concepcion), a former prostitute who now plans to marry Paul. The third Navy SEAL, John Stryzack (Corin Nemec), is furious over what he sees as America's betrayal of its responsibilities in the Philippines; he winds up behind bars after a violent incident, but he plans to escape to assassinate Senator Bladon, whom he believes is responsible for the closing of the base.

Cast and characters
Alexis Arquette as Paul Bladen
Alma Concepcion as Emma Salazar
Angel Aquino as Maria
Corin Nemec as John Stryzack
James Brolin as Ed Johnson
John Haymes Newton as William Hawk
Maureen Flannigan as Angela
Michael J. Sarna as Large Sailor
Michael York as Senator Bladon
Nanette Medved as Lisa
Daria Ramirez as Anna
Rae Dawn Chong as Danzig
Wolfgang Bodison as Jack Hamilton
Richard J. Gordon as himself, the mayor of Olongapo City

Release
The film premiered in the Philippines on August 20, 1997, and at the Film Market of the 1997 Cannes Film Festival, where the screening attracted curious distributors and the movie garnered some hype.

It had a television premiere in Greece, Finland as Hyvästi, Amerikka and in Germany as Im Namen der Ehre.

Reception
Most critics found the subject potent and timely. However, the film had an excess of characters and the end product was disorganized. It was hailed as a Philippine film thinly disguised as a Hollywood B-movie.

In Rotten Tomatoes it has an average score of 3 out of 5 based on 124 user reviews.

Home media
The official DVD of the film was released on April 16, 1999, in the Philippines and Hungary. In United States, the film was released by MTI Home Video. In Brazil, it was released by Sunset Productions and D+T.

See also

 List of films featuring the United States Navy SEALs

References

External links

1997 films
1997 action thriller films
1997 romantic drama films
Films set in the Philippines
Star Cinema films
Films about Filipino Americans
American romantic drama films
Films shot in the Philippines
Films about United States Navy SEALs
Films directed by Thierry Notz
1990s English-language films
1990s American films